Jennifer Davies (born 11 March 1982) is a Welsh rugby union player. She was included in the squad to the 2010 Women's Rugby World Cup. She made her international debut in 2003.

In January 2013 she was selected in the Wales squad for 2013 Women's Six Nations Championship.

References

External links
2010 Women’s RWC Profile
Wales Profile

1982 births
Living people
Rugby union players from Builth Wells
Wales international rugby union players
Welsh female rugby union players
Welsh rugby union players